Borness is a farm of around 1550 acres on the coast of Borgue Parish in the Stewartry of Kirkcudbrightshire (now part of Dumfries and Galloway).  It is probably more of a 'fermtoun' in that several cottages are present on the farm.  In the 1881 Census for Borgue, Borness supported a farmhouse with farmer, wife, 4 children, 3 female and 3 male servants, with 3 cottages (cothouses), each with a family living there.  The cottars all laboured on the farm.  The farmer employed in total 14 men, 6 women and 2 boys.  Borness sits above the heughs (cliffs) with an outlook across Wigtown Bay and the western portion of the Solway Firth.

Dumfries and Galloway
Farms in Scotland